The Serbian national baseball team represents Serbia in international baseball competitions.

History
The first recorded baseball game in Serbia was played in 1935, during the halftime of a football match between the Belgrade Sports Club and Hajduk Split in Belgrade. The first Serbian baseball club was formed in the late 80s as part of the JSD Partizan society, with their first match being in late May 1989 against Varaždin 1181 in Belgrade, the first recorded match there since 1935. BK Partizan played in the second tier of the Yugoslavian baseball league until the breakup of Yugoslavia. With the breakup of Yugoslavia, in order to maintain baseball's continued domestic survival, BK Partizan split into two teams, leading to the formation of BK Kings, based in Košutnjak. Alongside BK Dogs, based in Batajnica, BK Sleepers, based in Kragujevac (otherwise known at the time as the 'American Embassy' team), and BK Orlovi, the national league of what was now Serbia and Montenegro (FR Yugoslavia) continued from 1993 on, with its national team forming in 1994, and the Yugoslavian Baseball Federation (now Serbian Baseball Federation) being founded the same year.

The Yugoslavian Baseball Federation was admitted to the International Baseball Federation in 1995, and the Confederation of European Baseball in 1996. That same year, the national team participated in the B-group European Baseball Championship in Great Britain, recording five defeats. BK Kings and BK Dogs would merge into BK Beograd '96, and would help record the national team's first victory against Lithuania in 1998 on the B-group European Championships in Stockerau, Austria, finishing the championship with three victories and one defeat. 

The first dedicated baseball field in Serbia was built in 2001 on the Ada Ciganlija recreational ground in Belgrade, which helped the development of the sport. Some have since called for another court to be built in Novi Sad.  By September 2017, at least 10 baseball clubs were playing nationally, with others having come and gone since.

The best performance of the national team since 1998 was achieved in the 2004 B-group championship in Germany, taking the fourth place. In the next two B-group championships, the team did not fare well. Afterward, Serbia won the 2016 C-group European Baseball Championship in Slovenia, thus qualifying for the B group, its best performance since 2004. Along with Poland, it hosted the B group European Championship in Belgrade, on 24–29 July 2017. In 2022, along with Bulgaria and Lithuania, it hosted the European Baseball Championship Qualifiers in Belgrade. Domestically, in 2020, Beograd '96 would be crowned national champions for the 20th time.

Roster
Serbia's roster for the European Baseball Championship Qualifier 2022, the last official competition in which the team took part.

Tournament results
European Baseball Championship - B-Pool

European Under-21 Baseball Championship

Notes

Explanatory footnotes

Citations

External links
Serbian Baseball Federation
 Yugoslavian Baseball Federation
Serbian Softball Federation
Serbian Baseball Development Association

Baseball
National baseball teams in Europe